Holovyne is an urban-type settlement in Cherniakhiv Raion, Zhytomyr Oblast, Ukraine. Population:  In 2001, population was 1,969.

References

Urban-type settlements in Zhytomyr Raion
Volhynian Governorate